Svetozar Miletić is a village located in Sombor municipality in the West Bačka District of Vojvodina, Serbia. It is situated in Bačka geographical region. The village is ethnically mixed and its population numbering 2,746 inhabitants.

Name
The village was named after Svetozar Miletić, a political leader of Serbs in Vojvodina from second half of 19th century.

In Serbian, the village is known as Svetozar Miletić (Светозар Милетић), in Croatian as Lemeš (since 2009) or Svetozar Miletić (before 2009), in Bunjevac as Svetozar Miletić or Lemeš, in German as Milititsch, and in Hungarian as Nemesmillitics. Before 1925, in Serbian, Croatian and Bunjevac the name Lemeš (Лемеш) was used for the village.

The origin of the village name in Hungarian comes from the Hungarian word  (a noble), while for the word  it is believed that it comes from Latin  (a soldier). Local Bunjevci people have shortened and transformed the name Nemesmilitics into Lemeš. During the administration of the Kingdom of Serbs, Croats and Slovenes the village name was changed into Svetozar Miletić (in 1925).

Demographics

According to the last official census done in 2011, the village of Svetozar Miletić has 2,746 inhabitants.

Ethnic groups
According to the 2002 census, ethnic groups in the village included:
Hungarians = 1,455 (45.91%)
Croats = 581 (18.33%) (*)
Serbs = 549 (17.32%) (*)
Bunjevci = 217 (6.85%) (*)
Yugoslavs = 149 (4.70%) (*)
others.

(*) Total number of South Slavs (Croats, Serbs, Bunjevci, Yugoslavs) that live in the village is 1,496 (47.21%).

Famous persons 
 (1883-1944), journalist, writer, author of books for children, novelist
Gaja Alaga (1924–1988), theoretical physicist
Stevan Horvat (1932–2018), Greco-Roman style wrestler, Olympics silver medalist in 1968
Đuro Kanjurski (1853–1920), professor of Aramaic and Arabic at Royal University in Budapest
Grgo Knezi (1892–1944), priest, biologist
Petar Knezi (1859–1929), priest and writer
Tereza Kočiš (1932), gymnast that participated on several Olympics
Mirko Vidaković (1924–2002), botanist
dr Pajo Vidaković (1879–1942), priest, ethnologist, author of textbooks, writer

See also
List of places in Serbia
List of cities, towns and villages in Vojvodina

References

Slobodan Ćurčić, Broj stanovnika Vojvodine, Novi Sad, 1996.
Antonija Čota: "Lemeš - u osimu plemenitog ravničarskog drača"

External links

  History of Svetozar Miletić 

Places in Bačka
Sombor
West Bačka District